Ana Violeta Fagianni Enriquez de Maldonado (born c. 1943) is a Guatemalan diplomat, activist, and the former First Lady of Guatemala from 2015 until 2016. She is the wife of former acting President Alejandro Maldonado.

Prior to becoming the country's first lady, Fagianni served as career diplomat, including a posting as the Minister-counselor for the Embassy of Guatemala to Spain. She also served in El Salvador and Mexico. Additionally, Fagianni is an activist who has focused on women's rights, children and the elderly, and issues affecting the disabled in Guatemala.

In November 2015, First Lady Fagianni headed a major Guatemalan government delegation on a five-day official visit to Taiwan, where she held talks with President Ma Ying-jeou.

References

|-

Living people
Date of birth missing (living people)
Year of birth missing (living people)
First ladies of Guatemala
Guatemalan diplomats
Guatemalan women diplomats
Guatemalan people of Italian descent
Guatemalan expatriates in Spain